Pierre Champoux (born April 18, 1963 in Montreal, Quebec) is a retired  National Hockey League linesman, who wore uniform number 67.

References

1963 births
Living people
French Quebecers
National Hockey League officials
Ice hockey people from Montreal
20th-century Canadian people